The Only One(s) or Only One may refer to:

Music

Albums 
The Only One (Kenny Barron album), 1990
Only One (Shinhwa album), or the title song, 2000
Only One (U-KISS album), 2010
The Only Ones (album), by The Only Ones, 1978
Only One (BoA album), 2012
Only One, an album by Bizzy Bone, 2006

Songs

Songs with articles
"Only One" (BoA song), 2013
"The Only One" (The Cure song), 2008
"Only One" (Goo Goo Dolls song), 1995
"Only One" (Kanye West song), 2014
"The Only One" (Kiyotaka song), 2011
"Only One" (Peter Andre song), 1996
"The Only One" (Scooter song), 2011
"Only One" (Sigala song), 2016
"The Only One" (Transvision Vamp song), 1989
"Only One" (Yellowcard song), 2005

Other songs, Artists A–M
"The Only One", by The American Analog Set from Know by Heart, 2001
"The Only One", by The Black Keys from Brothers, 2010
"The Only One", by Blu & Exile from Give Me My Flowers While I Can Still Smell Them, 2012
"The Only One", by Bryan Adams from Cuts Like a Knife, 1983
"Only One", by Caleb Johnson from Testify, 2014
"The Only One", by Cro-Mags from Best Wishes, 1989
"The Only One", by Danger Mouse and Jemini from Ghetto Pop Life, 2003
"The Only One", by Evanescence from The Open Door, 2006
"Only One", by The Grass Roots from Move Along, 1972
"The Only One", by (həd) p.e. from Blackout, 2003
"The Only One", by Hot Chelle Rae from Whatever, 2011
"Only One", by James Taylor from That's Why I'm Here, 1985
"The Only One", by Jimmy Page, with Robert Plant on vocals, from Outrider, 1988
"Only One", by Jon B. from Comfortable Swagg, 2012
"Only One", by Khea with Julia Michaels and Becky G featuring Di Genius, 2021
"Only One", by Lifehouse from No Name Face, 2000
"The Only One", by Limp Bizkit from Results May Vary, 2003
"The Only One" by Lionel Richie from Can't Slow Down, 1983

Other songs, Artists N–Z
"The Only One", by Pet Shop Boys from Nightlife, 1999
"Only One", by PJ Morton from New Orleans, 2013
"Only One", by Sammy Adams, 2012
"The Only One", by Screaming Jets from All for One, 1991
"Only One", by Slipknot from Mate. Feed. Kill. Repeat., 1996
"Only One", by Sophie Ellis-Bextor from Trip the Light Fantastic, 2007
"The Only One", by Stiff Little Fingers from Go for It, 1981
"Only One", by Tommy Tutone from Tommy Tutone 2, 1981
"The Only One", by Vitamin C, a bonus track on Vitamin C
"The Only One", by The Wildhearts from ¡Chutzpah!, 2009

Other uses 
The Only One (1952 film), a Cuban musical film
The Only One (2006 film), a Belgian comedy-drama 
The Only Ones, an English rock band
The Only One, a 2003 fiction anthology by Christine Feehan

See also

One and Only (disambiguation)
The One and Only (disambiguation)
You're the Only One (disambiguation)
"I'm Not the Only One", a 2014 song by Sam Smith
"I'm the Only One", a 1993 song by Melissa Etheridge